Jean-Michel Hasler (born in 1945) is a French choral conductor, conductor, harpsichordist and musicologist.

Biography 
Jean-Michel Hasler is also the founder and current conductor of the "Camerata vocale de Brive", a cultural structure with a high level amateur choir and the Chronochromie ensemble, composed of professionals.

References

External links 
 Prélude by Jean-Michel Hasler on YouTube
 Jean-Michel Hasler on Discogs
 Jean-Michel Hasler on Human Music

1945 births
Living people
French choral conductors
French male conductors (music)
French harpsichordists
21st-century French conductors (music)
21st-century French male musicians